The Cleveland Browns were a baseball team in the Negro National League, based in Cleveland, Ohio, in 1924.   In their only season, they finished with a 17-34 record in league play.

Their manager that year was Baseball Hall of Fame member Sol White.

References

African-American history in Cleveland
Negro league baseball teams
Browns
Defunct baseball teams in Ohio
Baseball teams disestablished in 1924
Baseball teams established in 1924